A Privatization fund is a state-owned trust (business) holding formerly state owned enterprises and assets destined to be privatized, to be sold to private owners.

Notable privatization funds include:
 the East-German Treuhandanstalt
 the Czech První Privatizacni Fond (PPF)
 the Croatian Privatization Fund (CPF)
 the Hellenic Republic Asset Development Fund (HRADF)
 the Hungarian State Privatization Agency Állami Vagyonügynökség
 the Philippine Asset Privatization Trust (APF)

Further reading
 
 Sunita Kikeri, John Nellis, Mary M. Shirley: Privatization: The Lessons of Experience, The World Bank, Washington D.C., 1992.